Anny Helm, later also Anny Helm-Sbisà (20 July 1903 – 21 August 1993), was an Austrian operatic soprano. She was a member of the ensemble at the Stadttheater Magdeburg and at the Deutsche Oper Berlin and gave guest performances at numerous German theatres and at the Bayreuth Festival, in Vienna, Paris, London, Brussels and Buenos Aires as well as at all the major opera houses in Italy. She was one of the most sought-after dramatic sopranos of her time.

She was married to Giuseppe Sbisà, the director of the Teatro Lirico Giuseppe Verdi in Trieste.

Life and career 
Her singing teachers were the sopranos Marie Gutheil-Schoder and Gertrud Förstel in Vienna and the singing teacher Ernst Grenzebach in Berlin. She made her debut in 1924 at the Stadttheater Magdeburg and remained its ensemble member until 1926, followed by an engagement at the Deutsche Oper Berlin, of which she was a member until 1933. At the invitation of Siegfried Wagner, she appeared at the Bayreuth Festival every year from 1927 to 1931. There she made her debut in Siegfried Wagner's new production of Tristan und Isolde in the role of Brangäne, alongside Gunnar Graarud and Emmy Krüger, who embodied the title roles. In Bayreuth she also took over Kundry, Senta and finally Venus in Tannhäuser.

Parallel to her Berlin and Bayreuth engagements, the singer had a two-year guest contract at the Deutsches Theater Prag from 1931. In 1931 she made her debut as Venus at the Paris Opera, in 1932 as Valkyries-Brünnhilde at the Teatro Comunale di Firenze and as Siegfried-Brünnhilde in a single performance at the Vienna State Opera. Further guest appearances took Helm to the State Opera of Munich, Hamburg and Dresden as well as to the Grand Théâtre de Genève in 1933 and to the Théâtre de La Monnaie in Brussels, where she appeared in Wagner's Ring des Nibelungen.

In 1933 the singer moved her centre of life to Italy. She had married Giuseppe Sbisà, the director of the Trieste Opera. The couple had one daughter: Maria Sbisà Morsanutto. The artist was able to successfully continue her career at the first houses in Italy. Under the musical direction of Arturo Toscanini she took over the demanding title role in La Gioconda in 1934 in the Verona Arena. With this part - but also as Santuzza, also in the Arena - she proved that she could not be limited to the German repertoire, but was also predestined for dramatic roles in the Italian repertoire. In 1934 followed debuts at the Scala and at the Teatro dell'Opera di Roma , in 1935 also at the Teatro Comunale di Bologna. She appeared mostly as Brünnhilde in the various parts of the Ring, in the Teatro San Carlo of Naples she sang Brünnhilde in the Ring of the Nibelung. In Rome she could also be heard in three demanding title roles, as Isolde, Turandot and Elektra. She made her first guest appearance at the Teatro Colón of Buenos Aires in 1936, at the Royal Opera House Covent Garden in London in 1939, and in both cases she sang Venus in Tannhäuser. In 1944 she returned to the Vienna State Opera, once as Senta, twice as Turandot. In 1949 she appeared again at the théâtre de La Monnaie in Brussels.

After that she retired from the stage and lived as a singing teacher in Vienna until her death at the age of 90 in Bibione.

Repertoire

Recording 
The 1928 Bayreuth Tristan-and-Isolde cast (Gunnar Graarud and Nanny Larsén-Todsen in the title roles, Helm as Brangäne, Karl Elmendorff at the pulpit) was largely recorded by Columbia. She also took part in the recording of the Bayreuth Parsifal of 1927/28, conducted by Karl Muck.

Literature 
 Karl-Josef Kutsch, Leo Riemens: Großes Sängerlexikon. Fourth, extended and updated edition. K. G. Saur Verlag, Munich 2003, vol. 4.

References

External links 
 
 Helm, Anny on BMLO (in German)

1903 births
1993 deaths
Musicians from Vienna
Austrian operatic sopranos